Maria Beulah Woodworth-Etter (July 22, 1844–September 16, 1924) was an American healing evangelist. Her ministry style was a model for Pentecostalism.

Life
Woodworth-Etter was born in New Lisbon, Columbiana County, Ohio, as Mariah Beulah Underwood. She was born again at the beginning of the Third Great Awakening at the age of thirteen. Maria immediately heard the call of God and dedicated her life to the Lord. Of her calling she would later write, "I heard the voice of Jesus calling me to go out in the highways and hedges and gather in the lost sheep."  In 1863, she married Philo Horace Woodworth, whom she divorced for infidelity in 1891. She had six children with Woodworth, five of whom died young. In 1902, she married Samuel Etter, who died in 1914.
She studied the scriptures and began preaching the Lord's divine will in healing. It didn't take long to see that evangelism and healing went hand in hand as thousands were won to Christ as a result of seeing others healed. Sister Etter pioneered the way for Pentecostal manifestations that are so common in Charismatic and Pentecostal groups today.

Ministry
Her earliest exposure to religion was through a local Disciples of Christ congregation. After her marriage, she chose to enter evangelistic ministry. Prohibited from public preaching among the Disciples, she found support in a local Quaker meeting. It was while associating with the Quakers that she received the  baptism in the Holy Spirit while praying for an "anointing for service".

After this experience, she began to preach. Reporting hundreds of conversions, her campaigns attracted reporters from across the country. She was briefly affiliated with the Brethren in Christ but eventually joined the Church of God of the General Eldership founded by John Winebrenner. She was dismissed from the Church of God in 1904.

She began to pray for the sick in 1885, believing that those with sufficient faith would be healed. Her meetings also became known for people falling to the floor in trance-like states. These people would later report profound spiritual experiences while in such a state. As she preached throughout the nation, her reputation grew, leading her to purchase an 8,000-seat tent in which to conduct her services. In 1912 she joined the young Pentecostal movement and preached widely in Pentecostal circles until her death, helping found the Assemblies of God in 1914.

In 1918 she founded what is today Lakeview Church (Temple) of Indianapolis, Indiana.

References

Further reading 
 A Diary of Signs and Wonders, Maria Woodworth-Etter, Harrison House, 1916.
 Another testimony is of a man who had three broken ribs.  He was barely able to stand because of the pain he endured.  As Sister Etter laid hands on him he flinched but after the prayer of faith was given the bones that were turned inward came into place.  The same man, instantly healed, ended up pounding his ribs because he realized the pain and the swelling were gone (p. 63).
 Many strong men and women of God followed her ministry and were profoundly influenced by her abilities with God.  Aimee Semple McPherson and John G. Lake were two healing evangelists that are highly noted and took as much from Maria Woodworth-Etter's ministry as possible.
A Swiss woman, Mlle. Biolley, translated Signs and Wonders into French in 1919. Robert Label, a French Pentecostal minister who wrote the preface to the 5th edition, commented that the Pentecostal revival in France can be attributed in a certain measure to the ministry of Maria's books.
 "God's Generals", Roberts Liardson, Maria Woodworth-Etter- "Demonstrator of the Spirit"

External links
 Maria Woodworth-Etter: Strength Perfected in Weakness (Born-Again-Christian.Info)
 About Lakeview Church, Woodworth-Etter's Tabernacle
 Maria Woodworth-Etter: A Powerful Voice in the Pentecostal Vanguard (Enrichment Journal)
 Loose the Women (Christianity Today Library)
 Maria Woodworth-Etter Books (Ministry Helps)

1844 births
1924 deaths
19th-century evangelicals
20th-century evangelicals
American evangelicals
American evangelists
American Pentecostals